Oliver Gammelgaard Nielsen better known by his stage name TopGunn (born 3 April 1991) is a Danish rapper and music producer from Nørrebro, Copenhagen, born in Frederiksberg, Copenhagen. He has also established his own label CHEFF Records.

Career
Influenced by Danish dancehall scene, he published his first EP, Dansehallens Erobrer in 2010. Best known from the EP was the track "Averbaver" og "Gunmænd med pistoler". Through his residency in Ragnhildgade, he collaborated with Klumben in launching the latter's initial hit "Kriminel" which became an instant hit.

In addition TopGunn became part of Fuma Hi-Fi, with Firehouse which he produced in addition to contributing to them the tracks "Ingen Kokain" and "Xfactor" and with Nicholas Westwood (known as Kidd) most notably in Kidd's hit "Kysset med Jamel" and the ensuing "Kidd projektet". That also resulted in a 2012 documentary "Kidd Life".

TopGunn released his debut album on CHEFF Records in May 2013 called 21 after having success with singles "Hemligt nummer" and "Tilbud".

CHEFF Records
CHEFF Records is a hip hop label started by TopGunn that included acts Kidd, Klumben and ELOQ. The labels biggest selling album thus far is "Kidd Greatest Hits" that also led to a series of gigs. TopGunn's dancehall partner Klumben, also had huge success with his 2012 album "Fra Klumben Til Pladen". It was produced by TopGunn in collaboration with Maffi Promotions. TopGunn was featured on the track "Xfactor".

Discography

Albums

Singles

Featured in

Other charted songs

References

Danish rappers
1991 births
Living people
Musicians from Copenhagen
People from Frederiksberg